Live from Toronto is a double live album by The Who recorded during the last concert of the It's Hard Tour at the Maple Leaf Gardens in Toronto, 17 December 1982. These performances were originally broadcast live on cable TV and FM radio across the U.S. and Canada.  It was later released in the early 1980s on VHS video tape.

Keyboard player Tim Gorman performed with The Who on the 1982 tour. Tim reunited with the group in 2006 to record overdubs for the re-release of this material.

This 2006 edition of the concert was also released as a DVD. Both the DVD and double CD are legal releases, but they are not considered to be "authorized" products by the band and/or its management.

Track listing CD
All songs written by Pete Townshend except where noted.
Disc one
"My Generation" – 2:48
"I Can't Explain" – 2:30
"Dangerous" (John Entwistle) – 3:39
"Sister Disco" – 5:13
"The Quiet One" (Entwistle) – 4:22
"It's Hard" – 4:57
"Eminence Front" – 5:36
"Baba O'Riley" – 5:19
"Boris the Spider" (Entwistle) – 3:22
"Drowned" – 8:11
"Love Ain't for Keeping" – 2:40

Disc two
"Pinball Wizard" – 2:47
"See Me, Feel Me" – 4:14
"Who Are You" – 6:28
"5:15" – 6:27
"Love, Reign O'er Me" – 4:47
"Long Live Rock" – 5:06
"Won't Get Fooled Again" – 10:07
"Naked Eye" – 7:00
"Squeeze Box" – 2:52
"Young Man Blues" (Mose Allison) – 4:38
"Twist and Shout" (Bert Russell, Phil Medley) – 3:40

Track listing DVD
All songs written by Pete Townshend except where noted.
DVD
"My Generation" – 2:48
"I Can't Explain" – 2:30
"Dangerous" (John Entwistle) – 3:39
"Sister Disco" – 5:13
"The Quiet One" (Entwistle) – 4:22
"It's Hard" – 4:57
"Eminence Front" – 5:36
"Baba O'Riley" – 5:19
"Boris the Spider" (Entwistle) – 3:22
"Drowned" – 8:11
"Love Ain't for Keeping" – 2:40
"Pinball Wizard" – 2:47
"See Me, Feel Me" – 4:14
"Who Are You" – 6:28
"5:15" – 6:27
"Love, Reign O'er Me" – 4:47
"Long Live Rock" – 5:06
"Won't Get Fooled Again" – 10:07
"Naked Eye" – 7:00
"Squeeze Box" – 2:52
"Young Man Blues" (Mose Allison) – 4:38
"Twist and Shout" (Bert Russell, Phil Medley) – 3:40

Personnel
The Who
Roger Daltrey – lead vocals, rhythm guitar, harmonica
Pete Townshend – lead guitar, backing and lead vocals
John Entwistle – bass, backing and lead vocals
Kenney Jones – drums

Additional musicians
Tim Gorman – keyboards

References

The Who live albums
2006 live albums
Immortal Records live albums
Albums recorded at Maple Leaf Gardens
Music of Toronto